John Thomas Connor (November 3, 1914 – October 6, 2000) was an American government official and businessman.  He served as the United States Secretary of Commerce from January 18, 1965 to January 31, 1967.

Life and career 
Connor was born in Syracuse, New York, to Michael Joseph and Mary Vivian (née Sullivan) Connor.  Connor graduated from Syracuse University and Harvard Law School, where he was a member of the Phi Kappa Psi fraternity. Connor was a Roman Catholic. He married the former Mary O'Boyle on June 22, 1940; they had two sons and one daughter. He was a lawyer in New York. In 1942, he became a researcher for the Office of Scientific Research and Development, which helped to find cures for many diseases and illnesses.

He served in the United States Marine Corps as the assistant to the future Navy secretary James V. Forrestal. He was working on penicillin production and procurement issues.  He worked in the pharmaceutical industry after the World War II, entering politics as the co-chairman of the Johnson-Humphrey Campaign in 1964.

He was awarded the Commerce Secretaryship in 1965 but wielded less influence within the administration than Secretary of the Treasury Henry H. Fowler and the Economic Advisor Gardner Ackley. He helped to the settle an East Coast dock strike in 1965, as well as a General Electric strike in 1966.  Connor resigned on January 31, 1967.

In the 1970s, headed the Committee of Business Executives against the Vietnam War, and was to also, the served as the Rockefeller Commission to the investigation of the CIA activities.

He died from leukemia at Massachusetts General Hospital in Boston, Massachusetts on October 6, 2000, at the age of 85.  Connor was interred in Mosswood Cemetery in Cotuit, Massachusetts.

References

External links

1914 births
2000 deaths
Syracuse University alumni
Harvard Law School alumni
United States Secretaries of Commerce
Deaths from cancer in Massachusetts
Businesspeople from Syracuse, New York
Lyndon B. Johnson administration cabinet members
20th-century American politicians
Politicians from Syracuse, New York
Lawyers from Syracuse, New York
Catholics from New York (state)
Henry Laurence Gantt Medal recipients
Military personnel from Syracuse, New York